The Confederation of Public Employees' Trade Unions (KESK) is one of the four major national trade union centers in Turkey. It was formed in 1995.

KESK is affiliated with the International Trade Union Confederation, and the European Trade Union Confederation.

Affiliated unions

See also

 Confederation of Turkish Trade Unions
 Confederation of Turkish Real Trade Unions
 Confederation of Revolutionary Trade Unions of Turkey

References

External links
 KESK official site.

National trade union centers of Turkey
International Trade Union Confederation
European Trade Union Confederation
Trade unions established in 1995
Organizations based in Istanbul